Crenicichla yaha is a species of cichlid native to South America. It is found in the Arroyo Urugua-í and río Iguazú basins in Argentina.

References

Casciotta, J.R., A.E. Almirón and S.E. Gómez, 2006. Crenicichla yaha sp. N. (Perciformes: Labroidei: Cichlidae), a new species from the río Iguazú and Arroyo Urugua-í basins, northeastern Argentina. Zoologische Abhabdlungen 56:107-112.

yaha
Fish of Argentina
Taxa named by Jorge Rafael Casciotta
Taxa named by Adriana Edith Almirón
Taxa named by Sergio Enrique Gómez
Fish described in 2006